The following is a list of churches in East Dorset.

List 

 St Mary's Church, Ferndown
 Wimborne Minster
 United Church Ferndown

References 

East Dorset
East Dorset